Frigyes Sándor Pabsz (4 July 1914 – 28 December 1945) was a Hungarian rower. He competed at the 1936 Summer Olympics in Berlin with the men's coxless four where they were eliminated in the semi-final.

References

1914 births
1945 deaths
Hungarian male rowers
Olympic rowers of Hungary
Rowers at the 1936 Summer Olympics
Sportspeople from Pula
European Rowing Championships medalists